The tug of war contest at the 1920 Summer Olympics was held on August 17, 1920, and on August 18, 1920. All medals were decided by using the Bergvall system. This was the last time the tug of war was in the Olympic program.

Medal summary

Participating nations
A total of 40(*) tug of war competitors from 5 nations competed at the Antwerp Games:

 
 
 
 
 

(*) NOTE: Only competitors who participated in at least one pull are counted.

Two Italian reserves are known.

Results

Gold medal round

Silver medal round

Bronze medal round

References
International Olympic Committee results database

External links
 

 
1920 Summer Olympics events
1920
1920 in tug of war